Chahkand-e Mud (also Romanized as Chahkand-e Mūd; also known as Chah Kand) is a village in Mud Rural District, Mud District, Sarbisheh County, South Khorasan Province, Iran. At the 2006 census, its population was 176, in 61 families.

References 

Populated places in Sarbisheh County